David Jay Pecker (born September 24, 1951) is an American publishing executive and businessman, who was the CEO of American Media until August 2020. He was the publisher of Men's Fitness, Muscle and Fitness, Flex, Fit Pregnancy, Shape and Star. He was also the publisher of National Enquirer, Sun, Weekly World News, and Globe.

In 2018, Pecker became embroiled in controversy regarding his involvement in a catch and kill operation to buy exclusive rights to stories that might embarrass his friend Donald Trump, to prevent the stories from becoming public during the latter's 2016 presidential campaign.

Early life
Pecker was born on September 24, 1951, in The Bronx, New York City. He is of Jewish descent. His father was a bricklayer who died in 1967 when Pecker was 16. To support his mother, he started bookkeeping for local businesses in New Rochelle, New York and in the Bronx. He graduated from Pace University.

Career
After college, Pecker began his career as an accountant at Price Waterhouse and in 1979 joined the accounting department at CBS's magazine division, rising to vice president and comptroller. Eight years later, CBS sold its magazine division in a leveraged buyout to its manager, Peter Diamandis; Pecker stayed on in his position . Diamandis later sold the magazines to Hachette Filipacchi Médias. After Diamandis's departure three years later, Pecker was appointed CEO at Hachette Filipacchi Media U.S. In 1999, Pecker left Hachette when he raised capital from Thomas H. Lee Partners and Evercore Partners to buy American Media, Inc. (AMI), publisher of the Star, the Globe, the National Enquirer, and the Weekly World News.

During his time as chairman and chief executive officer of AMI Pecker served as publisher of the magazines Men's Fitness, Muscle and Fitness, Flex, Fit Pregnancy, Shape and Star, as well as the supermarket tabloids National Enquirer, Star, Sun, Weekly World News, Globe. Sun and Weekly World News have ceased publication. In 2019, Pecker announced that he had agreed drop more of AMI's tabloids and sell the National Enquirer, Globe and National Examiner to Hudson News.

Pecker serves on the board of directors of iPayment Holdings, Inc., Sunbeam Products, Inc. and Next Generation Network, Inc. In August 2018, after his interactions with President Donald Trump were heavily reported, Pecker resigned as a director of Postmedia Network Canada Corp., a leading Canadian media company, a position he had held since October 2016.

In 2016, Pecker revealed to the Toronto Star that American Media Inc. now relied on support from Chatham Asset Management and its owner Anthony Melchiorre due to financial troubles. By the time Pecker agreed to sell the National Enquirer on April 10, 2019, Chatham Asset Management owned 80 percent of American Media Inc's stock. Melchiorre, who expressed dismay towards the National Enquirer's scandals involving assistance to Trump's 2016 Presidential campaign and blackmail of Jeff Bezos, was also instrumental in forcing Pecker and American Media Inc. to sell the National Enquirer as well.

AMI removed Pecker as CEO in August 2020, keeping him on in the role of executive advisor. Simultaneously, the company was renamed a360Media in anticipation of a merger with another Chatham property, the logistics firm Accelerate 360.

Involvement with Donald Trump 

Beginning in March 1998, Hachette Filipacchi Media U.S., of which Pecker was then CEO, began producing Trump Style, which was distributed to guests at Donald Trump's properties. Pecker has described himself as a close friend of Trump. Pecker supported Trump's initial run for president as part of the Reform Party in 2000.

In an August 2014 meeting at Trump Tower, Pecker offered to Trump that he would use the National Enquirer to catch and kill any allegations of sexual affairs against him.

Trump's lawyer Michael Cohen requested that Pecker's AMI buy the rights to Stormy Daniels's story, though Pecker refused to do so.

By 2018, Pecker and AMI found themselves under investigation for using catch and kill payments, in which AMI purchased the exclusive rights to stories that might have been damaging to Trump's 2016 campaign for President and then refused to publish them. Such a tactic may have represented illegal and/or undeclared "in-kind" campaign donations under Federal Election Commission rules.

In March 2018, Karen McDougal filed a lawsuit against American Media in Los Angeles Superior Court, aiming to invalidate the non-disclosure agreement preventing her from speaking about an alleged affair with Trump. Pecker had directed AMI to purchase the exclusive rights to the story for $150,000 in 2016, allegedly to keep it from the public. In April 2018 the lawsuit was settled and McDougal was released from the agreement. AMI also agreed to feature her on the cover of another AMI magazine, Men's Journal, in September 2018.

In April 2018, FBI agents searched the office and residences of Michael Cohen, in part to search for evidence of Trump's involvement in the payment to McDougal. In July 2018, a tape became public which confirmed this payment; the tape was secretly recorded by Cohen during a conversation with then candidate Trump in 2016.

In late 2015, AMI paid $30,000 to Dino Sajudin, a doorman at Trump Tower, to obtain the rights to his story in which he alleged Trump had an affair in the 1980s that resulted in the birth of a child. Sajudin in April 2018 identified the woman as Trump's former housekeeper. AMI reporters were given the names of the woman and the alleged child, while Sajudin passed a lie detector test when testifying that he had heard the story from others. Shortly after the payment was made, Pecker ordered the reporters to drop the story. In April 2018, AMI chief content officer Dylan Howard denied the story was "spiked" in a catch and kill operation, insisting that AMI did not run the story because Sajudin's story lacked credibility. CNN obtained a copy of the contract between AMI and Sajudin in August 2018, after AMI had released Sajudin from the contract. CNN published excerpts of the contract, which instructed Sajudin to provide "information regarding Donald Trump's illegitimate child", but did not contain further specifics of Sajudin's story.

Federal investigators subpoenaed Pecker and AMI in April 2018, with Pecker providing prosecutors details about the hush payments Cohen had arranged. In August 2018, Pecker was also granted witness immunity in exchange for his testimony of Trump's knowledge of the payments.

On February 27, 2019, Cohen testified under oath to the House Oversight Committee that he and Pecker conspired to "catch-and-kill" stories which had the potential to damage Trump.

Accusations of extortion by Jeff Bezos and Ronan Farrow 
In January 2019, Pecker's National Enquirer published what it called "sleazy text messages and gushing love notes" between Amazon CEO Jeff Bezos and a romantic partner. Bezos began investigating how his personal communications reached the paper. The next month, Bezos accused the National Enquirer of extortion and blackmail by threatening to release Bezos' intimate pictures, criminal accusations Pecker denied through an attorney. Bezos wrote that AMI proposed in writing that Bezos state publicly that he and his security consultant "have no knowledge or basis for suggesting that AMI's coverage was politically motivated or influenced by political forces." In return, AMI would withhold publication of the pictures.

Both AMI and the Manhattan prosecutor launched reviews of the accusations. Any violation of law by AMI would constitute a breach of the immunity agreement the company reached with prosecutors in 2018 after the paper agreed to "catch and kill" a story on behalf of then-candidate Donald Trump. Ronan Farrow, a journalist, said he and another journalist received similar demands from AMI.

Personal life
In 1987, Pecker married Karen Balan.

See also
2017–18 United States political sexual scandals
Legal affairs of Donald Trump
Stormy Daniels–Donald Trump scandal
Timeline of Russian interference in the 2016 United States elections
Timeline of investigations into Donald Trump and Russia (January–June 2018)
Timeline of investigations into Donald Trump and Russia (July–December 2018)
Timeline of investigations into Donald Trump and Russia (2019)

References

1951 births
Living people
American publishing chief executives
Businesspeople from New York City
Pace University alumni
People from the Bronx
National Enquirer people